Lieutenant John Mitchell,  (11 March 1888 – 2 January 1964) was an Royal Air Force (RAF) officer who served in World War I and the Allies' North Russia Intervention.

Early life
He was born in Wilton, Scottish Borders to Charles & Mary Ann. He was the fourth of seven children. Before the war he was a Police Constable in the English county of Durham.

Military career
John Mitchell disembarked from Novorossisk, Russia on 25 June 1919 as part of a Royal Air Force air support group. On 30 July 1919 he was part of a reconnaissance mission of three de Havilland DH.9A planes of the RAF's No. 47 Squadron over southern Russia. While on their mission, ground fire punched holes in the fuel tank of the DH.9A of Flight Lieutenant Walter Anderson and observer officer Mitchell. Mitchell climbed onto the wing and plugged the holes with his fingers. When another DH.9A was forced down by anti-aircraft fire, Anderson and Mitchell landed to pick up its crew, Captain Eliot (Future Air Chief Marshal Sir William Elliot) and Lieutenant Laidlaw. Mitchell was still on the wing so Laidlaw took over the plane's Lewis machine gun in the rear cockpit and was able to hold off charging Bolshevik cavalry. Anderson was able to get their plane to take off again with Mitchell holding onto the wing to plug the fuel tank's hole with his fingers. Despite being burned by the aircraft's exhaust, they returned safely to base with the rescued crew.

Mitchell was only dressed in shorts and a drill tunic but was still able to hold onto the plane against a  slipstream. His fingers were not totally able to plug the holes in the fuel tank and it leaked all over his body. If a fire had sparked his fuel-soaked clothes on the plane, he would have been covered in flame. While burned from the exhaust, he still went flying the next day.

Anderson and Mitchell were to be nominated for the Victoria Cross, but supporting documentation was lost during the evacuation from Russia. Instead of the Victoria Cross, the two received the Distinguished Service Order and later the Distinguished Flying Cross for their actions.

On 6 August 1919 Mitchell was shot from the ground and hospitalized while flying as an observer to Captain Anderson in DH9 D2942. He embarked to the United Kingdom on 28 March 1920. In June 1923 he transferred to the RAF Reserve and completed his service on 5 June 1929.

Later life and death
He left his wife after the wife and moved to Canada where he worked as a mechanic at Rolls-Royce in Halifax, Canada before meeting his second wife, Minnie LaRue who was from the Isle of Guernsey. The two married and returned to Guernsey. During World War II the islands were occupied by Nazi troops. The occupying German forces deported over 1,000 Guernsey residents, including Mitchell, to camps in southern Germany, notably to the Lager Lindele (Lindele Camp) near Biberach an der Riß and to Laufen. He returned after the war. John Mitchell died on 2 January 1964 on the Isle of Guernsey of coronary thrombosis and arteriosclerosis.

Bibliography
Notes

References

 - Total pages: 288 
 - Total pages: 208  

 
 - Total pages: 224 

1888 births
1964 deaths
Scottish military personnel
Royal Air Force personnel of World War I
Royal Air Force personnel of the Russian Civil War
Royal Air Force officers